Sebastian Gutierrez (born July 6, 1998) is an American football offensive tackle for the Las Vegas Raiders of the National Football League (NFL). He played college football at Minot State Beavers.

Professional career

Denver Broncos
After not being selected in the 2022 NFL Draft Gutierrez signed with the Denver Broncos as an undrafted free agent. On August 29 Gutierrez was waived by the Broncos.

New England Patriots
On October 5 Gutierrez signed to the Patriots practice squad. On October 11th the patriots released Gutierrez from the practice squad.

Las Vegas Raiders
Oc October 25 Gutierrez signed to the Raiders practice squad. On December 19 Gutierrez was elevated to the active roster. Five days later Gutierrez made his NFL debut against the Pittsburgh Steelers, playing two snaps. He signed a reserve/future contract on January 9, 2023.

References

1998 births
Living people
American football offensive tackles
Minot State Beavers football players
Denver Broncos players
New England Patriots players
Las Vegas Raiders players